Dave Luckett (born 1951) is an Australian children's writer born in Stanmore, New South Wales. He has written three non-fiction books about cricket and medieval weapons and armour. He has also written three series of fantasy books as well as a number of standalone fantasy books. One of the series, The Rhianna Chronicles, has been reprinted in the United States and Poland. His A Dark Winter won the Aurealis Award for best fantasy novel in 1998.

Bibliography

Children's fantasy

School of Magic
The Truth About Magic (2005)
The Return of Rathalorn (2005)

Tenabran Trilogy
A Dark Winter (1997)
A Dark Journey (1999)
A Dark Victory (1999)

The Rhianna Chronicle 
Rhianna and the Wild Magic (2000) (US title The Girl, the Dragon, and the Wild Magic (2003))
Rhianna and the Dogs of Iron (2002) (US title: The Girl, the Apprentice, and the Dogs of Iron (2004))
Rhianna and the Castle of Avalon (2002) (US title: The Girl, the Queen, and the Castle (2004))

Standalone fiction books

 Jupiter Tonnens (1993)
 The Patternmaker (1994)
 The Adventures of Addam (1994)
 The Wizard and Me (1995)
 Night Hunters (1995)
 Switching Current (1996)
 Deals On Wheels (1996)
 The Best Batsman in the World (1996)
 The Last Eleven (1997)
 I am Cool (2000)
 City, Seen by Lightning (2003)
 Subversive Activity (2009)

Short fiction

"History: Theory and Practice". Light Touch Paper, Stand Clear (2012)

Nonfiction
Cricket Australia: Kids' Ultimate Fan's Handbook (2004)
Iron Soldiers: A Story of Arms and Armour (2005)
Howzat!: A Celebration of Cricket (2005) with (Max Fatchen)

References

External links

Australian children's writers
Australian science fiction writers
1951 births
Living people
Australian male novelists